Chaker Zehi (also Romanized as Chāker Zehī and Chākar Zehī; also known as Chākar Zā’ī, Chākarzī, Chāker Zā’ī) is a village in Polan Rural District, Polan District, Chabahar County, Sistan and Baluchestan Province, Iran. At the 2006 census, its population was 161, in 27 families.

References 

Populated places in Chabahar County